The Men's pursuit competition of the Beijing 2022 Olympics was held on 13 February, at the National Biathlon Centre, in the Zhangjiakou cluster of competition venues,  north of Beijing, at an elevation of . Quentin Fillon Maillet of France won the event. Tarjei Bø of Norway won the silver medal, and Eduard Latypov, representing the Russian Olympic Committee, won bronze, his first individual Olympic medal.

Summary
The 2014 and 2018 champion, Martin Fourcade, retired from competitions. The silver medalist, Sebastian Samuelsson, qualified for the Olympics, as well as the bronze medalist, Benedikt Doll. The overall leader of the 2021–22 Biathlon World Cup before the Olympics was Fillon Maillet, who was also the leader in the pursuit. Samuelsson was standing second in the pursuit ranking. 

Both Johannes Thingnes Bø and Fillon Maillet, who started first and second respectively, did not miss targets in the first shooting, and Bø was faster than Fillon Maillet. On the second shooting, Bø missed two targets and Fillon Maillet did not miss, and the advantage of Bø dropped to 13 seconds. Latypov was third 35 seconds behind Bø. In the third shooting, Johannes Thingnes Bø missed three more targets, whereas Fillon Maillet and Latypov did not miss. Fillon Maillet was leading, 10 seconds ahead of Latypov, 40 seconds ahead of Tarjei Bø and Lukas Hofer, and 55 seconds ahead of Johannes Thingnes Bø. Latypov caught up with Fillon Maillet, but missed a target on the last shooting. Fillon Maillet, Tarjei Bø, and Hofer did not miss. As a result, after the shooting Fillon Maillet was leading with an advantage of about 40 seconds over the three. Johannes Thingnes Bø was 1:35 behind Fillon Maillet, and other athletes out of medal contention. The advantage was sufficient for Fillon Maillet to win gold. Tarjei Bø was second, and Latypov third.

Qualification

Results
The race was started at 18:45.

References

Biathlon at the 2022 Winter Olympics
Men's biathlon at the 2022 Winter Olympics